The Federated States of Micronesia competed at the 2020 Summer Olympics in Tokyo. Originally scheduled to take place from 24 July to 9 August 2020, the Games were postponed to 23 July to 8 August 2021, due to the COVID-19 pandemic. This was the nation's sixth appearance at the Olympics, since its debut in 2000.

Competitors
The following is the list of number of competitors in the Games:

Athletics

Federated States of Micronesia received a universality invitation from the World Athletics to send a male track and field athlete to the Olympics.

Track & road events

Swimming

Federated States of Micronesia received a universality invitation from FINA to send two top-ranked swimmers (one per binary gender) in their respective individual events to the Olympics, based on the FINA Points System of June 28, 2021.

References

Olympics
2020
Nations at the 2020 Summer Olympics